Dharanindravarman II (also titled Paramanishkalapada) was king of the Khmer Empire from 1150 to 1160.  

He married the daughter of Harshavarman III, Princess Sri Jayarajacudamani. Their son Jayavarman VII was born by 1125.

Dharanindravarman II was a cousin of the king he succeeded, Suryavarman II. 

The Yuhai encyclopedia records that in 1155 “Zhenla-Luohu” (that is, Cambodia) sent two elephants as tribute to the Song emperor.

See also
Early history of Cambodia
Khmer Empire
Preah Khan Kompong Svay

References

External links
 History of Jayavarman VII

12th-century Cambodian monarchs
Khmer Empire
Hindu monarchs
Cambodian Hindus